The third and final series of The Circle began airing on Channel 4 on 16 March 2021, hosted by Emma Willis, and concluded on 9 April 2021 following twenty-one episodes. The series premiered after the conclusion of The Celebrity Circle. Due to the COVID-19 pandemic, the series was pre-recorded from 13 September 2020 to 6 October 2020.

On 9 April 2021, the series was won by Natalya Platonova, who had played the game catfishing as "Felix", a 29-year-old Paratrooper. Manrika Khaira was the runner-up of the series. Both players finished joint-first in the final ratings, but due to Natalya receiving the most top ranks, she was crowned overall winner. In a change from previous series, there was no viewers winner. Instead, Natalya received the full £100,000 prize fund. In May 2021, Channel 4 announced that it would not be renewing the show and that season 3 would be the last.

Format changes
Due to the series being pre-recorded, the weekly live shows that featured in the previous series were axed and instead replaced by a regular highlights episode. Unlike previous series, host Emma Willis delivered video messages to the players informing them of upcoming twists, similar to the spin-off Celebrity series. These messages could be private to the players or shown to the group. Due to being pre-recorded, the viewers vote at the end of the series was also axed. Instead, the winner from the series received the full prize fund of £100,000.

Players
The first set of contestants taking part in the series were revealed on 13 March 2021.

Results and elimination

Notes

Reception
The Guardian reviewed the series positively in the final week, describing it as "The next Big Brother" and embracing "the unnatural nature of reality TV", though "twists may have tipped slightly into excess in the final week".

Manrika Khaira was singled out for abuse and death threats on social media during the airing of the programmes. Digital Spy put this down to young women being "often seen to be 'acting above their station' if they are anything but apologetic and accommodating to others. Other factors, such as race, can also compound this issue." Digital Spy concluded that she was "getting a lot of air time at the moment, which just goes to show that without her involvement there can't be much else happening in The Circle that would be worth us watching." After the series finale, Khaira's management company asked Channel 4 to stop posting content about her, in an attempt to reduce the backlash.

The i newspaper described players "Syed" and Andy as "beloved both in and out of The Circle" and described Manrika as "a reality TV gift". It concluded that the series had "made for exceptional television, gripping us with twists and turns every night".

Viewing figures 
Official, 28-day consolidated ratings are taken from BARB and include Channel 4 +1. Catch-up service totals are added to the official ratings.

References

Channel 4 reality television shows
2021 British television seasons
The Circle (franchise)